Astylosternus ranoides is a species of frog in the family Arthroleptidae.
It is endemic to Cameroon.
Its natural habitats are subtropical or tropical moist montane forests, subtropical or tropical high-altitude shrubland, subtropical or tropical high-altitude grassland, rivers, swamps, and freshwater lakes.
It is threatened by habitat loss.

References

Astylosternus
Endemic fauna of Cameroon
Taxonomy articles created by Polbot
Amphibians described in 1978